Dread Hunger is a 2022 video game developed by Dread Hunger Team and published by Digital Confectioners.

Gameplay 
Dread Hunger is a Social deception Survival Adventure game with PVP and PVE elements.

Development 
The game was originally scheduled to release in late 2021.

Reception 

Dread Hunger received "mixed or average" reviews according to review aggregator Metacritic.

Sales 
Dread Hunger has sold more than 1 million copies.

References 

2022 video games